Arbizu is a village and municipality in the province and autonomous community of Navarre, northern Spain, neighbouring Etxarri-Aranatz. Its traditional "fiesta" falls on June 24, St. John's day, and is noted for the feast held in the main square.

References

External links
 ARBIZU in the Bernardo Estornés Lasa - Auñamendi Encyclopedia (Euskomedia Fundazioa) 
 

Municipalities in Navarre